A Matter of Earnestness is a 1965 Greek comedy film directed by Alekos Sakellarios.

Cast 
 Lambros Konstantaras - Andreas Mavrogialouros
 Dionysis Papagiannopoulos - Thodoros Grouezas
 Niki Linardou - Aliki Mavrogialourou
 Andreas Douzos - Giorgos
 Giorgos Gavriilidis - Kostas
 Melpo Zarokosta - Nanta Mavrogialourou
 Mitsi Konstadara - Lambaina
 Haris Panagiotou - Panagos
 Nikitas Platis - Fotis
 Christos Doxaras - Sotiris
 Takis Christoforidis - Efstathiou
 Giota Soimiri - Katina
 Makis Demiris - Nikolaos Lahouris

References

External links 

1965 comedy films
1965 films
Greek comedy films
1960s Greek-language films